Guy II (sometimes III) (died late 882 or early 883) was the eldest son and successor of Lambert I as Duke of Spoleto and Margrave of Camerino. He was elected to succeed to these titles on his father's death in 880. He had an ambitious plan of expansion to the south and to the west that conflicted with the Papacy.

He received a papal letter on 18 July in the year of his accession. Pope John VIII asked for a meeting, but Guy ignored him and instead invaded the Papal States. John responded by begging the aid of Charles the Fat, already King of Italy, and crowning him Emperor on 12 February 881. Charles did little to help against Guy, however. A papal letter dated to 11 November and addressed to Charles referred to Guy as Rabbia, an epithet meaning "rage." It stuck as a nickname.

As ruler, Guy used the motto Renovatio regni Francorum (renewing the kingdom of the Franks), like his Carolingain predecessors. In February 882, at a diet convoked in Ravenna by Charles, the duke, emperor, and pope made peace and Guy and his uncle, Guy of Camerino, vowed to restore stolen papal lands. In a March letter to Charles, John claimed that the vows went unfulfilled. Guy never succeeded in his dreams of expansion or in keeping his promises: he died young, later that year or early in the next. His uncle succeeded him, as his children were minors. His son Guy IV later ruled in Spoleto and the Principality of Benevento. His daughter Itta married Guaimar I of Salerno.

Notes

Bibliography

9th-century dukes of Spoleto
Guideschi dynasty
Margraves of Italy
9th-century births
883 deaths

Year of birth unknown